Yokadani Dam  is a rockfill dam located in Hiroshima Prefecture in Japan. The dam is used for irrigation. The catchment area of the dam is 4.6 km2. The dam impounds about 5  ha of land when full and can store 361 thousand cubic meters of water. The construction of the dam was completed in 1963.

References

Dams in Hiroshima Prefecture